Semiricinula is a genus of sea snails, marine gastropod mollusks in the subfamily Rapaninae of the family Muricidae, the murex snails or rock snails.

Species
Species within the genus Semiricinula include:
 Semiricinula bozzettii Houart & Héros, 2013 
 Semiricinula fusca Küster, 1862
 Semiricinula hadrolineae (Houart, 1996)
 Semiricinula konkanensis (Melvill, 1893)
 Semiricinula muricina (Blainville, 1832)
 Semiricinula muricoides (Blainville, 1832)
 Semiricinula squamigera (Deshayes, 1832)
 Semiricinula squamosa (Pease, 1868)
 Semiricinula tissoti (Petit de la Saussaye, 1852)
 Semiricinula tongasoa Bozzetti, 2018
 Semiricinula turbinoides (Blainville, 1832)
Species brought into synonymy
 Semiricinula chrysostoma (Deshayes, 1844): synonym of Morula chrysostoma (Deshayes, 1844)
Semiricinula marginatra (Blainville, 1832): synonym of Neothais marginatra (Blainville, 1832)
 Semiricinula nodosa (Hombron & Jacquinot, 1841) : synonym of Orania nodosa (Hombron & Jacquinot, 1848)

References

 Claremont M., Vermeij G.J., Williams S.T. & Reid D.G. (2013) Global phylogeny and new classification of the Rapaninae (Gastropoda: Muricidae), dominant molluscan predators on tropical rocky seashores. Molecular Phylogenetics and Evolution 66: 91–102.

External links
 Martens, E. von. (1879). Übersicht der von W. Peters von 1843 bis 1847 in Mossambique gesammelten Mollusca. Monatsberichte der königlich Preussischen Akademie der Wissenschaften zu Berlin. 1879(7): 727-749.
 Iredale, T. (1918). Molluscan nomenclatural problems and solutions.- No. 1. Proceedings of the Malacological Society of London. 13(1-2): 28-40

 
Rapaninae